Mohak station is a railwaystatiom.

References

Kokubu, Hayato, 将軍様の鉄道 (Shōgun-sama no Tetsudō), 

Railway stations in North Korea
Buildings and structures in South Pyongan Province